William D. S. Daniel, (Assyrian: ܘܠܝܡ ܕܢܝܐܝܠ) was an Assyrian writer, poet and musician. He was born March 17, 1903, in Urmia, Iran and died in San Jose, California, in 1988.

Books 
Cyrano de Bergerac (Translation)
Kateeny the Great (Epi/Assyrian)
Rameena the Naughty (Children's Stories)
The Rays of Light (Songs Book)
William Daniel's Creations (Music Collection)
Assyrians of Today, Their Problems and a Solution

See also 
Paulus Khofri
Yosip Bet Yosip

References 

1903 births
1988 deaths
Syriac-language singers
Iranian composers
Iranian Assyrian people
20th-century Iranian male singers
20th-century composers
Assyrian musicians
Assyrian Iranian writers
Assyrian writers
Iranian emigrants to Switzerland
People from Urmia
Iranian emigrants to the United States
Iranian people of Assyrian descent